The Podocopida are an order of ostracods in the subclass Podocopa. It is the most diverse of the four orders of ostracods, and also has a rich fossil record.

Taxonomy
The following suborders and unassigned taxa are contained in the order Podocopida:
Superfamily †Carbonitacea
Suborder Bairdiocopina
Suborder Cypridocopina
Suborder Cytherocopina
Suborder Darwinulocopina
Suborder Sigilliocopina

See also
Cyprididae

References

Podocopida
Crustacean orders